Guy Coburn Robson (1888–1945) was a British zoologist, specializing in Mollusca, who first named and described Mesonychoteuthis hamiltoni, the colossal squid.

Robson studied at the marine biological station in Naples, and joined the staff of the Natural History Museum in 1911, becoming Deputy Keeper of the Zoology Department from 1931 to 1936.

Evolution

Robson is best known for his major book The Variations of Animals in Nature (co-authored with O. W. Richards, 1936) which argued that although the fact of evolution is well established, the mechanisms are largely hypothetical and undemonstrated. The book claims that most differences among animal populations and related species are non-adaptive. It was published before major developments in the modern synthesis and contains critical evaluation of natural selection. It was positively reviewed in science journals in the 1930s. Zoologist Mark Ridley has noted that "Robson and Richards suggested that the differences between species are non-adaptive and have nothing to do with natural selection."

Historian Will Provine has commented that the book "has been in disrepute since the late 1940s because of its antagonism to natural selection" but notes that it was the "best known general work on animal taxonomy" before the work of Julian Huxley and Ernst Mayr. Huxley in Evolution: The Modern Synthesis (1942), described the book as "an undue belittling of the role of selection in evolution."

Publications

Guide to the Mollusca exhibited in the Zoological Department, British Museum (1923)
The Species Problem (1926)
A Monograph of the Recent Cephalopoda. Based on the collections in the British Museum, Natural History (two volumes, 1929–1932)
The Variation of Animals in Nature (with O. W. Richards) (1936)

Quotes

References

The Natural History Museum – William T. Stearn

1888 births
1945 deaths
20th-century British zoologists
Employees of the Natural History Museum, London
British malacologists
Non-Darwinian evolution
Teuthologists